The Cheese Shop is a well-known sketch from Monty Python's Flying Circus.

It originally appeared in episode 33, "Salad Days" on 30 November, 1972. The script for the sketch is included in the 1989 book The Complete Monty Python's Flying Circus: All the Words, Volume 2.

It was later reworked for the album The Monty Python Matching Tie and Handkerchief and appeared for one last time during Monty Python Live (Mostly), as a surprising coda to the Dead Parrot sketch.

Origins

The idea for the sketch came after a day of shooting in Folkestone Harbour, where John Cleese became seasick and threw up repeatedly while trying to deliver a line. During the drive back, Graham Chapman recommended that Cleese eat something and asked him what he wanted; Cleese replied that he fancied a piece of cheese. Upon seeing a chemist's shop, Cleese pondered whether the shop would sell cheese, to which Chapman responded that if they did it would be medicinal cheese and that Cleese would need a prescription to buy some. Giggling, they decided to write a sketch based on that idea. However, on starting to write it, they concluded that asking for cheese in a chemist's shop was too unrealistic without being set up. Wondering why someone would attempt to buy cheese somewhere other than a cheese shop, Cleese thought that they should write a sketch about someone attempting to buy cheese in a cheese shop that had no cheese whatsoever to set up a sketch revolving around someone attempting to buy cheese at a chemist's which never wound up happening.

Chapman then wrote the sketch with Cleese, who did not initially find it humorous. When Chapman insisted that it was funny, they presented it at a reading for the other Python members. Though most of the other Pythons were also unimpressed, Michael Palin loved it and laughed hysterically, eventually falling to the floor. This amused the others and they agreed to use the sketch.

Summary
Cleese plays an erudite customer (Mr. Mousebender in the script) attempting to purchase some cheese from "Ye National Cheese Emporium, purveyor of fine cheese to the gentry (and the poverty-stricken too)". The proprietor (Palin), Mr. Arthur Wensleydale (Henry Wensleydale in the TV version), appears to have nothing in stock, not even cheddar, "the single most popular cheese in the world". A slow crescendo of bouzouki music plays in the background performed by Joe Moretti, as Terry Jones and Graham Chapman dance while dressed in bowler hats and business suits. Cleese initially expresses appreciation of the music, being "one who delights in all manifestations of the Terpsichorean Muse", but as the sketch progresses it mirrors Cleese's growing frustration until he loudly demands the music cease. As Cleese lists increasingly obscure, unsavoury, and, in one instance fictional, cheeses to no avail, the proprietor offers weak excuses such as "Ohh! The cat's eaten it."  Cleese remarks that it is not much of a cheese shop, but Palin insists it is the best in the district due to its cleanliness, to which Cleese replies "Well, it's certainly uncontaminated by cheese."  Eventually, Cleese asks if Palin has any cheese at all, to which Palin replies "yes". Cleese then tells him that he will ask the question again, and if Palin says "no", he will shoot him "through" the head. Palin answers "no" the second time, and Cleese immediately shoots him, then muses, "What a senseless waste of human life!"  He then puts on a Stetson, and the sketch segues into Hugh Walpole's Rogue Cheddar and a link to the Sam Peckinpah's "Salad Days" sketch.

Cheeses
Forty-three cheeses are mentioned in the original sketch. In the audio version on The Monty Python Matching Tie and Handkerchief album and other live and recorded versions, Cleese also mentions Greek feta. In the 2014 reunion show Monty Python Live (Mostly), Stinking Bishop, Armenian string cheese and Zimbabwean rhinoceros milk cheese were also added to the list.

"Venezuelan Beaver Cheese" is a fictitious type of cheese but it has been mentioned in Monty Python's The Meaning of Life (PC game), Sierra's computer adventure game Leisure Suit Larry 7, and in the webcomic Triangle and Robert.

Pastiches and parodies

 The sketch was reworked for The Brand New Monty Python Bok, becoming a two-player word game in which one player must keep naming different cheeses while the other player must keep coming up with different excuses; otherwise, "the Customer wins and may punch the Shopkeeper in the teeth".
 On The Young Ones, in the series two episode "Time", Alexei Sayle rushes into a shop (while performing a silly walk), and asks if it is a cheese shop. Rik Mayall, the Palinesque proprietor, replies "No, sir." Sayle then turns to the camera and says, "Well, that's that sketch knackered then, innit?"
 Goodness Gracious Me parodied the sketch with the "Asian Bride Shop" sketch, substituting descriptions of types of brides. At the end, another customer enters, complaining that his bride is dead – referencing the Dead Parrot sketch.
 A pastiche circulated in 2004 to parody the SCO v. IBM lawsuit. The judge, taking Cleese's role, inquires of the Palinesque attorney for The SCO Group as to the evidence he will be presenting for his suit, only to discover after a similar line of questioning that SCO has no evidence at all. The script was an attack on the quality of the SCO lawsuit, implying that it was exceedingly frivolous.
 The "Weird Al" Yankovic song "Albuquerque" parodies the sketch by portraying a similar situation in a doughnut shop. The scene ends when the shopkeeper reveals that all he has is a "box of one dozen starving, crazed weasels"; the main character purchases and opens it and is attacked by the creatures inside.
 The cartoon Histeria! depicts the Boston Tea Party, in which a fake tea shop is set up to distract a British guard. Each time the guard asks for a type of tea, there is a splash heard off screen, and the American says they're out, implying that each particular tea had just been thrown into the harbour.
 In the webcomic The Order of the Stick skit "It's Not a Gaming Session Until Someone Quotes Monty Python", Roy and a weapons merchant re-enact the scene with polearms of various regional design replacing cheese.
 Joe Gregorio made a parody, "Problems with HTTP Authentication Interop", about the state of current HTTP authentication.
 A wheel of Le Brouère cheese was flown aboard the first SpaceX Dragon 1 reusable space capsule on 8 December 2010 in reference to this sketch. The presence of the space cheese was made known the day after the successful flight.
 The original codename for Python Package Index (the central software repository for the Python programming language) was "CheeseShop" in reference to this sketch. The current standard packaging format for Python software is called "wheel", as a reference to a wheel of cheese.

See also
 List of British cheeses
 Smackout
 Olympia Cafe

References

External links
 

Cheese
Lists of cheeses
Monty Python sketches
Fiction about retailing